Rampon may refer to:

 Rampon, Count of Barcelona (died 825)
 Antoine-Guillaume Rampon (1759–1842), general officer during the French Revolutionary Wars
 Joachim Rampon (1805–1883), French soldier, aristocrat and politician